Old Tafo  is the oldest town  in the Akyem Abuakwa Traditional area in the Abuakwa North Municipality in the Eastern Region of south Ghana. It is the home of the famous Ohum Festival, the only festival widely celebrated by the people of Akyem Abuakwa. It houses the Ohum dua, an over 500-year-old spiritual tree that does not wither; and the Ohum shrine where the mighty deity Agyempremu Kofi resides. Old Tafo shares border with New Tafo where the Cocoa Research Institute of Ghana (CRIG) is located. It also shares a border with Osiem, where the Memeneda Gyidi Church is located, founded by Opanin Samuel Brako.

Education
Old Tafo is known for WBM Zion Secondary School School. The school is a second cycle institution. WMB Zion Secondary School.

References

Populated places in the Eastern Region (Ghana)